Bowbrook is a village in Shropshire, England, now a western suburb of Shrewsbury.

Villages in Shropshire